"Address to the Devil" is a poem by Scottish poet Robert Burns. It was written in Mossgiel in 1785 and published in the Kilmarnock volume in 1786. The poem was written as a humorous portrayal of the Devil and the pulpit oratory of the Presbyterian Church.

Content 
It begins by quoting from Milton's Paradise Lost as a contrast with the first two lines of the poem itself:

These lines are also a parody of a couplet in Alexander Pope's satire The Dunciad.

The poem was written in a Habbie stanza with the stanza six lines long and the rhyme scheme AAABAB. Burns used a similar stanza in Death and Doctor Hornbook.

The poem is also skeptical of the Devil's existence and of his intentions to punish sinners for all eternity as in the stanza.

Hear me, auld Hangie, for a wee,
An’ let poor damned bodies be;
I’m sure sma’ pleasure it can gie,
Ev’n to a deil,
To skelp an’ scaud poor dogs like me,
An’ hear us squeel!

This contrasts with the views contained in works such as Paradise Lost and the preachings of the Church.

See also
The Holy Tulzie

References

Further reading
 Robert Burns Robert Burns Penguin Classics 1994 
 David Punter, A Companion to the Gothic Blackwell Publishing 2001  page 73
 Robert Burns, The Works of Robert Burns Wordsworth Editions 1998  especially page 571
 Jerome J McGann, Byron and Romanticism Cambridge University Press 2002  page 269

External links

 The Cambridge History of English and American Literature in 18 Volumes Volume XI Chapter X on Burns
 The Burns Encyclopedia article on Address to the Deil

Poetry by Robert Burns
1786 poems
Fiction about the Devil